Julian the Hermit of Mesopotamia adopted the ascetic life during the reign of Roman emperor Julian the Apostate in the fourth century AD.  Saint Julian dwelt in solitude near the river Euphrates.

It was in his solitude that Julian heard from God that the apostate emperor would soon die.  The emperor's death quickly came to pass as the Lord had revealed to Julian.

Through the efforts of St. Julian, a church was built on Mount Sinai in memory of the obtaining of the tablets of the Law by the holy Prophet Moses on the spot where Moses was standing when he received the tablets.

Venerable Julian the Hermit of Mesopotamia is commemorated 18 October in the Eastern Orthodox, Byzantine Catholic, and Roman Catholic Churches.

See also

Desert Fathers
Stylites

References

External links
Orthodox Church in America
Raven's Bread Newsletter

Hermits in the Roman Empire
4th-century Romans
4th-century Christian saints
Eastern Orthodox monks
Eastern Catholic monks